Ernanodontidae ("sprouts of toothless animals") is an extinct family of insectivorous stem-pangolins which were endemic to Asia from the middle Paleocene to the early Eocene, 62.22—55.8 Ma existing for approximately .

Classification and phylogeny

Classification
 Family: †Ernanodontidae (Ting, 1979)
 Genus: †Asiabradypus (Nessov, 1987)
 †Asiabradypus incompositus (Nessov, 1987)
 Genus: †Ernanodon (Ting, 1979)
 †Ernanodon antelios (Ting, 1979)

Phylogenetic tree
The phylogenetic relationships of Ernanodontidae are shown in the following cladogram:

References

Palaeanodonta
Prehistoric mammals of Asia
Myrmecophagous mammals
Prehistoric mammal families